Engram  is the fourth studio album by Beherit. It features a return to a straight black metal style.

Track listing
"Axiom Heroine" – 4:41
"Destroyer of Thousand Worlds" – 3:05
"All in Satan" – 3:33
"Pagan Moon" – 7:16
"Pimeyden Henki" – 4:45
"Suck My Blood" – 4:27
"Demon Advance" – 15:17

Charts

References

2009 albums
Beherit albums